Gary Chilala Nkombo (born 1 March 1965) is a Zambian politician and business man. He is the current Local Government And Rural Development Minister.

Career
Nkombo was first elected as an MP in the 2006 Zambian general election representing Mazabuka Central in the National Assembly as a member of the United Party for National Development. He was again elected MP in the 2011, 2016 and 2021 Zambian general elections.

In September 2021, Nkombo was appointed Minister of Local Government And Rural Development.

Controversy
In 2022, Nkombo forced a woman brewing kachasu to drink it with her children. After a video circulated on social media, many people expressed disappointment in the minister. A few days later,  he apologised to the family and was forgiven.

Personal life
Nkombo is a teacher by profession, a politician and a businessman. He is married and has two sons and a daughter.

References

1965 births
Living people
Members of the National Assembly of Zambia
Local government ministers of Zambia